Mazar Hotel is a hotel in Mazar-e-Sharif, Afghanistan. The hotel is decorated in 1930s decor, featuring all high ceilings, grand dining rooms and pillars. Described as a "medium-class" hotel", despite being one of the city's best hotels, in the late 1970s the hotel was said to also accommodate for campers.

References

Hotels in Afghanistan
Mazar-i-Sharif